The Winnipeg Whips were a professional Triple-A minor league baseball team based in Winnipeg, Manitoba, Canada that played in the International League from 1970 to 1971.  The team was affiliated with the Montreal Expos of Major League Baseball and played its home games at Winnipeg Stadium.

The franchise was founded as the Buffalo Bisons, a founding member of the International League in 1886.  The Expos purchased the Bisons shortly after joining the National League in 1969 and were eager to relocate the struggling team, to the extent that the team was moved midseason from Buffalo to Winnipeg in June 1970.  The Expos selected Winnipeg even though it was located 1,100 miles from the nearest league rival.  As part of the move, the Expos agreed to pick up the additional travel costs of opposing teams, believing it would be a temporary measure until the Whips could switch to the American Association, a Triple-A league operating in the Midwestern United States, which was much closer to Winnipeg. Clyde McCullough managed the team at its inception.

The Whips did not fare well on the field, finishing in last place in both 1970 and 1971. In 1971, the team only won 44 of its 140 games, and only 17 of its final 74. McCullough was replaced as manager during the year by Jim Bragan, and Steve Shea would also take his turn as manager of the ballclub. Skyrocketing costs, coupled with the failed bid to join the American Association, forced the Expos to give up on Winnipeg and move the team to Hampton, Virginia after the 1971 season.  

The team became the Peninsula Whips and played two seasons out of Hampton War Memorial Stadium, located just 19 miles from the IL's Tidewater Tides.  After drawing only 48,680 fans in 1973, the AAA franchise was moved to Memphis, Tennessee and played in the international League as the Memphis Blues through 1976.  They moved to Charleston, West Virginia and assumed the identity of the Charleston Charlies, who had relocated to Columbus, Ohio for the 1977 season.  After a stop in Old Orchard Beach, Maine (Maine Guides), the franchise founded as the Buffalo Bisons and once known as the Winnipeg Whips is now playing out of Moosic, Pennsylvania as the Scranton/Wilkes-Barre RailRiders.

Major League alumni

John Bateman
Gil Blanco
Don Bosch
Kevin Collins
Boots Day
Bill Dillman
Pepe Frías
Jim Gosger
Rich Hacker
Don Hahn
Larry Haney
Remy Hermoso
José Herrera
Walt Hriniak
Terry Humphrey
Garry Jestadt
Larry Loughlin
Leo Marentette
Mike Marshall
Clyde Mashore
Ernie McAnally
Dave McDonald
Dan McGinn
Joe Moock
Balor Moore
Rich Nye
John O'Donoghue
Adolfo Phillips
Jim Qualls
Bob Reynolds
Steve Rogers
Carroll Sembera
Don Shaw
Steve Shea
Tommie Sisk
Dick Smith
Joe Sparma
Stan Swanson
Mike Torrez
Freddie Velázquez
Mike Wegener
Fred Whitfield
Jimy Williams
Ron Woods

Notes

References

Baseball teams established in 1970
Defunct International League teams
Defunct baseball teams in Canada
Montreal Expos minor league affiliates
Baseball teams in Winnipeg
Baseball teams disestablished in 1973